Richia parentalis is a species of cutworm or dart moth in the family Noctuidae. It is found in North America.

The MONA or Hodges number for Richia parentalis is 10882.

References

Further reading

 

Noctuinae